Conandron ramondioides is a species of flowering plant in the family Gesneriaceae. It is native to eastern Asia, where it is found in China, Japan, and Taiwan. Its natural habitat is on damp rock faces, in forests and along streamsides. It is a common species in Japan.

It is a perennial, growing to ~30 cm tall. It has large basal leaves. Flowers are purple and produced in the summer.

Its Japanese name (岩煙草) is "rock tobacco", in reference to the resemblance of its leaves to tobacco, and its preference to grow on exposed rock.

References

Didymocarpoideae